Hamnesfjord or Hamnesfjorden is a fjord in Surnadal Municipality in Møre og Romsdal county, Norway. The fjord flows west into the main Trongfjorden. There are few settlements along the fjord due to the steep mountainsides along the fjord.

References

Fjords of Møre og Romsdal
Surnadal